Gambler's Help is a network of agencies funded by the State Government in Victoria, Australia to provide a range of community served for gambling related issues. Gambler's Help is administered by the Victorian Responsible Gambling Foundation, but receives funding from the Community Support Fund which receives a portion of the profits from the operation of gaming machines (better known as poker machines) in Victoria.

History 

Gambler's Help was established under the name Breakeven in 1994 with the first regional services commencing operation in 1995. The name was changed to Gambler's Help in November 2000.

Network 

The Gambler's Help network in the state of Victoria consists of:

 A range of projects and a communications campaign delivered and managed by the Office of Gaming and Racing's Problem Gambling Unit
 A statewide telephone counselling service
 Gambler's Help Line 1800 858 858
 Regional services which provide counselling, financial counselling and community education as well as manage local projects.

Separately funded are a Gambler's Help Indigenous service and multicultural service.

External links
Problem Gambling Victoria

References 

Problem gambling organizations
Victoria State Government
Gambling in Australia